The Netherlands Film Festival is an annual film festival, held in September and October of each year in the city of Utrecht.

During the ten-day festival, Dutch film productions and co-productions are exhibited. Besides feature films, the program also consists of short subjects, documentary films, and television productions. On the closing evening of the festival, the Golden Calves are awarded to the best films, directors, and actors.

Together with the Netherlands Film Fund, the festival also recognises box office results of Dutch film productions during the year with the Crystal Film (10,000 visitors of documentary films), Golden Film (100,000 visitors), Platinum Film (400,000 visitors), and Diamond Film (1,000,000 visitors).

History
The Netherlands Film Festival was founded in 1981 by the Dutch film maker Jos Stelling, who called it the "Netherlands Film Days". Initially, the festival was oriented towards film makers only, but it gradually reached a broader audience. 

The 36th edition of the festival, in 2016, attracted more than 150,000 visitors.

Canon of Dutch cinema
In 2007, the festival presented their Canon of Dutch Cinema, containing sixteen monumental films in Dutch film history. The list included the following films:
The Misadventure of a French Gentleman Without Pants at the Zandvoort Beach (Willy Mullens and Alberts Frères, 1905)
A Carmen of the North (Maurits Binger, 1919)
Rain (Joris Ivens, 1929)
The Tars (Jaap Speyer, 1934)
 (Herman van der Horst, 1952)
Fanfare (Bert Haanstra, 1958)
Like Two Drops of Water (Fons Rademakers, 1963)
Blind Kind (Johan van der Keuken, 1964)
 (Adriaan Ditvoorst, 1965)
Living (Frans Zwartjes, 1971)
Turkish Delight (Paul Verhoeven, 1973)
Flodder (Dick Maas, 1986)
The Northerners (Alex van Warmerdam, 1992)
The Pocket-knife (Ben Sombogaart, 1992)
 (Jos de Putter, 1993)
Father and Daughter (Michaël Dudok de Wit, 2000)

Special guests
Since 1992, the festival organisation invites a special guest, usually a respected director or actor in the Dutch film business.

 1992: Paul Schrader
 1993: Krzysztof Zanussi
 1994: Rutger Hauer
 1995: Nouchka van Brakel
 1996: Jan de Hartog
 1997: Monique van de Ven
 1998: First Floor Features
 1999: ?
 2000: Heddy Honigmann
 2001: Renée Soutendijk
 2002: Pieter Verhoeff
 2003: Jan Decleir
 2004: Jean van de Velde
 2005: Jos Stelling
 2006: Johanna ter Steege
 2007: Burny Bos
 2008: Monic Hendrickx
 2009: Jack Wouterse
 2010: Anneke Blok
 2011: Frans van Gestel
 2012: Jeroen Willems
 2013: Paula van der Oest
 2014: Fons Merkies
2016: Willem de Beukelaer

Awards
Besides the Golden Calves the Festival also has its own special awards.

 Dutch Film Critics award
 Award of the city Utrecht
 Tuschinski Award (former Cannon City Prize)
 Talent & Pro Student Award
 NPS Award for best short film
 Teen Award
 Cinema.nl Film Poster Award (former Skrien Afficheprijs)
 Grolsch Film Award

Opening films
 1981 The Girl with the Red Hair
 1982 
 1983 Giovanni
 1984 
 1985 
 1986 The Pointsman
 1987 
 1988 Shadow Man
 1989 Blueberry Hill
 1990 Vigour
 1991 The Province
 1992 The Three Best Things in Life
 1993 Unknown Time
 1994 1000 Roses
 1995 Antonia's Line
 1996 
 1997 Tropic of Emerald
 1998 
 1999 Under the Palms
 2000 Wild Mussels
 2001 
 2002 Ramses
 2003 Phileine Says Sorry
 2004 Simon
 2005 Life!Life!
 2006 Waiter
 2007 Duska
 2008 In Real Life
 2009 Tramontana
 2010 TirzaTirza
 2011 The Gang of Oss
 2012 The Zigzag Kid
 2013 The Price of Sugar
 2014 Reckless
 2015 J. Kessels
 2016 
 2017 Tulipani, Love, Honour and a Bicycle
 2018 Open Seas
 2019 Instinct
 2020 BuladóBuladó
 2021

See also
Cinema of the Netherlands
Documentary film of the Netherlands

References

External links
 Official website
 Netherlands Film Festival at the Internet Movie Database

Film festivals in the Netherlands
Recurring events established in 1981
Mass media in Utrecht (province)
 
1981 establishments in the Netherlands